Jasenovo is a village in Serbia. It is situated in the Bela Crkva municipality, in the South Banat District, Vojvodina province. The village has a Serb ethnic majority (84.37%) and a population of 1,446 (2002 census).

Historical population

1961: 2,333
1971: 2,108
1981: 2,062
1991: 1,927
2002: 1,446
2011: 1,243

See also
List of places in Serbia
List of cities, towns and villages in Vojvodina

References

Slobodan Ćurčić, Broj stanovnika Vojvodine, Novi Sad, 1996.

External links
 Map of the Bela Crkva municipality showing the location of Jasenovo

Populated places in Serbian Banat
Populated places in South Banat District
Bela Crkva